Hans Häckermann (March 3, 1930 in Pirna, Germany – September 16, 1995 in Ritzerau, Germany) was a German actor.

Filmography

External links

1930 births
1995 deaths
People from Pirna
German male television actors
20th-century German male actors